Hidden Valley, also known as Warwickton, is a historic home located near Bacova, Bath County, Virginia. It was built in 1858, and is a two-story, five-bay, brick structure with a hipped roof in a Greek Revival / Late Victorian style. It has a rear ell. The front facade features a pedimented tetra-style portico with Ionic order columns, placed over the central three bays of the five-bay facade. The entrance is styled upon a design on Plate 28 in Asher Benjamin's stylebook, The Practical Carpenter (1835).

It was listed on the National Register of Historic Places in 1970.

References

Houses on the National Register of Historic Places in Virginia
Greek Revival houses in Virginia
Houses completed in 1858
Houses in Bath County, Virginia
National Register of Historic Places in Bath County, Virginia
1858 establishments in Virginia